Edward Hamlin Everett House, is a 1915 Beaux-Arts mansion located, just off Dupont Circle, at 1606 23rd St., NW in Washington, D.C. that today is the Residence of the Ambassador of Turkey.

History

The building, Beaux-Arts in style, was built between 1910 and 1915 for Edward Hamlin Everett, a bottling millionaire.  Everett's company, The American Bottle Company, merged with Corning to eventually become Owens Corning. Prior to the 1929 stock market crash, his estimated wealth was between $40–50 million. Everett also owned Château de l'Aile in Vevey, Switzerland and The Orchards, his summer residence in Bennington, Vermont that was also designed by Totten and later became Southern Vermont College.

The house was designed by George Oakley Totten Jr., a graduate of the École des Beaux-Arts in Paris who was one of Washington D.C.'s most prolific and skilled architects in the Gilded Age. The house was built as the winter residence for Everett who sought to enter society in the nation's capital.

"As one moves past the Neoclassical façade, rooms jump from Baroque to Ottoman to Renaissance to Art Nouveau styles, studiously maintaining their individual integrity against each other."

After Everett's death, his widow, Grace Burnap, approached the Turkish government and offered to rent out the mansion to them. Totten, the architect of the house, had spent a brief period in Turkey as the official architect for Ottoman Sultan Abdul Hamid II. The Turkish ambassador, Munir Ertegun, moved in with his family in 1934. Several years later, they bought the mansion, fully furnished with Everett's antiques, including Sèvres porcelain and Gobelin wall tapestries.

In 2007, the house was fully restored after three years and $20 million renovation by Washington restoration architect Belinda Reeder and embassy interior designer Anikó Gaal Schott.

Turkish attacks

On May 16, 2017, dozens of peaceful protestors were assaulted by Turkish security officials. Turkish President Recep Tayyip Erdoğan, visiting the Ambassador's residence that sits on Sheridan Circle, watched the clashes from a distance.

Gallery

See also

 History of Washington, D.C.

References

External links

The Bottle-Top Mansion: The Ertegün family and the story of Turkey's Washington Embassy by Thomas Roueché in Cornucopia Magazine (2010)

Houses completed in 1915
Beaux-Arts architecture in Washington, D.C.
Individually listed contributing properties to historic districts on the National Register in Washington, D.C.
Gilded Age mansions